Events from the year 1944 in the United States.

Incumbents

Federal Government 
 President: Franklin D. Roosevelt (D-New York)
 Vice President: Henry A. Wallace (D-Iowa)
 Chief Justice: Harlan F. Stone (New York)
 Speaker of the House of Representatives: Sam Rayburn (D-Texas)
 Senate Majority Leader: Alben W. Barkley (D-Kentucky)
 Congress: 78th

Events

January
 January 20 – The U.S. Army 36th Infantry Division, in Italy, attempts to cross the Gari River.
 January 22 – World War II – Battle of Anzio: the Allies begin the assault on Anzio, Italy. The U.S. Army 45th Infantry Division stands their ground at Anzio against violent assaults for 4 months.
 January 30 – World War II: United States troops invade Majuro, Marshall Islands.
 January 31 – 
 World War II: American forces land on Kwajalein Atoll and other islands in the Japanese-held Marshall Islands.
 USS Franklin is commissioned.

February
 February 1 – World War II: United States troops land in the Marshall Islands.
 February 3 – World War II: United States troops capture the Marshall Islands.
 February 14 – SHAEF headquarters is established in Britain by General Dwight D. Eisenhower.
 February 17 – World War II: the Battle of Eniwetok Atoll begins; it ends in an American victory on February 22.
 February 20 – The United States takes Eniwetok Island.
 February 22 – United States Strategic Air Forces in Europe organized from the Eighth Air Force's strategic planning staff; subsuming strategic planning for all US Army Air Forces in Europe and Africa.
 February 29 – World War II – Battle of Los Negros and Operation Brewer: the Admiralty Islands are invaded by U.S. forces.

March
 March 2 – The 16th Academy Awards ceremony, hosted by Jack Benny, is held, the first Oscar ceremony held at a large public venue, Grauman's Chinese Theatre in Hollywood. Michael Curtiz's Casablanca wins the Outstanding Motion Picture, with Curtiz winning Best Director. Henry King's The Song of Bernadette receives the most nominations with 12 and wins the most awards with four.
 March 4 – In Ossining, New York, Louis Buchalter, the leader of 1930s crime syndicate Murder, Inc., is executed at Sing Sing prison, along with Emanuel "Mendy" Weiss and Louis Capone.

April
 April 3 – Smith v. Allwright decided in the Supreme Court prohibits white primaries.
 April 25 – The United Negro College Fund is incorporated.
 April 28 – World War II: 749 American troops are killed in Exercise Tiger at Start Bay, Devon, England.

May
 May 8 – World War II: USS Ticonderoga is commissioned.
 May 24 – World War II: Six LSTs are accidentally destroyed and 163 men killed in Pearl Harbor's West Loch disaster.
 May 31 – World War II: Destroyer escort  sinks the sixth Japanese submarine in two weeks. This anti-submarine warfare performance remains unmatched through the twentieth century.

June

 June 5 – US and British paratrooper divisions jump over Normandy, in preparation for D-Day. All including 82nd and 101st Airborne divisions of the United States.
 June 6 – World War II – Battle of Normandy: Operation Overlord, commonly known as D-Day, commences with the landing of 155,000 Allied troops on the beaches of Normandy in France. The Allied soldiers quickly break through the Atlantic Wall and push inland, in the largest amphibious military operation in history. This operation helps liberate France from Germany and also weakens the Nazi hold on Europe.
 June 15 
Battle of Saipan: the United States invades Saipan.
American forces push back the Germans in Saint-Lô, capturing the city.                                                        
 June 16 - George Stinney, a 14-year old African-American, is executed for being accused of killing two white girls in his hometown, Alcolu, South Carolina. The execution took place in South Carolina Penitentiary in Columbia, South Carolina by electric chair.
 June 26 – World War II: American troops enter Cherbourg.

July
 July 1 – The United Nations Monetary and Financial Conference begins at Bretton Woods, New Hampshire.
 July 6 
Hartford Circus Fire: More than 100 children die in one of the worst fire disasters in the history of the United States.
World War II: At Camp Hood, Texas, future baseball star and 1st Lt. Jackie Robinson is arrested and later court-martialed for refusing to move to the back of a segregated U.S. Army bus. He is eventually acquitted.
 July 17 – Port Chicago disaster: The SS E. A. Bryan, loaded with ammunition, explodes at the Port Chicago, California, Naval Magazine, killing 320 sailors and civilian personnel.
 July 19 – President Franklin D. Roosevelt is renominated for a fourth term at the 1944 Democratic National Convention. Missouri Senator Harry Truman is selected to be the vice presidential nominee.
 July 21 – Battle of Guam: American troops land on Guam (the battle ends August 10).

August
 August 6 – USS Bennington is commissioned.
 August 7 – IBM dedicates the first program-controlled computer, the electromechanical Automatic Sequence Controlled Calculator (known best as the Harvard Mark I).
 August 9 – The United States Forest Service and the Wartime Advertising Council release posters featuring Smokey Bear for the first time.
 August 12 – Major fire at Luna Park, Coney Island, New York.
 August 14 – Fort Lawton riot
 August 15 – World War II: Operation Dragoon lands Allies in southern France. The U.S. Army 45th Infantry Division participates in its fourth assault landing at St. Maxime, spearheading the drive for the Belfort Gap.
 August 20 – World War II: American forces successfully defeat Nazi forces at Chambois, closing the Falaise Gap.
 August 31 – The mysterious "Mad Gasser of Mattoon" attacks in Mattoon, Illinois, apparently resume.

September

 September 3 – Black mother Recy Taylor is kidnapped and gang raped by six white men in Abbeville, Alabama; failure to indict any of her assailants provokes nationwide protest and activism among the African American community.
 September 5 – The 5.8  Cornwall–Massena earthquake affects the northern New York town of Massena at the Canada–United States border with a maximum Mercalli intensity of VII (Very strong), causing $2 million in damage, but no deaths. Across the border, Cornwall, Ontario suffers greater damage.
 September 14 – USS Shangri-La is commissioned.
 September 17 – World War II: Operation Market Garden begins.
 September 24 – World War II: the U.S. Army 45th Infantry Division takes the strongly defended city of Epinal before crossing the Moselle River and entering the western foothills of the Vosges.
 September 25 – World War II: Operation Market Garden ends in an Allied withdrawal.

October

 October 8 – The Adventures of Ozzie and Harriet radio show debuts in the United States.
 October 9 - 
 The St. Louis Cardinals defeat the St. Louis Browns, 4 games to 2, to win their 5th World Series Title. This is the only all St. Louis World Series.
 USS Randolph is commissioned.
 October 20 
 World War II: American and Filipino troops (with Filipino guerrillas) begin the Battle of Leyte in the Philippines. American forces land on Red Beach in Palo, Leyte, as General Douglas MacArthur returns to the Philippines with Philippine Commonwealth president Sergio Osmeña and Armed Forces of the Philippines Generals Basilio J. Valdes and Carlos P. Romulo. American forces land on the beaches in Dulag, Leyte, accompanied by Filipino troops entering the town, and fiercely opposed by the Japanese occupation forces. The combined forces liberate Tacloban.
 An LNG explosion destroys a square mile (2.6 km2) of Cleveland, Ohio.
 October 21 – World War II: Aachen, the first German city to fall, is captured by American troops.
 October 23–26 – World War II: Naval Battle of Leyte Gulf in the Philippines – In the largest naval battle in history by most criteria and the last naval battle in history between battleships, combined U.S. and Australian naval forces decisively defeat the Imperial Japanese Navy.
 October 25 – Florence Foster Jenkins gives a notorious recital in Carnegie Hall, New York City.
 October 30 – Appalachian Spring, a ballet by Martha Graham with music by Aaron Copland, debuts at the Library of Congress in Washington, D.C., with Graham in the lead role.

November
 November 6 – Hanford Site in Washington (state) produces its first plutonium.
 November 7 
U.S. presidential election, 1944: Franklin D. Roosevelt wins reelection over Republican challenger Thomas E. Dewey, becoming the only U.S. president elected to a fourth term.
A passenger train derails in Aguadilla, Puerto Rico, due to excessive speed on a declining hill; 16 are killed, 50 injured.
 November 26 – USS Bon Homme Richard is commissioned.

December
 December 10 – Legendary Italian conductor Arturo Toscanini leads a concert performance of the first half of Beethoven's Fidelio (minus its spoken dialogue) on NBC Radio, starring Rose Bampton. He chooses this opera for its political message – a statement against tyranny and dictatorship. Presenting it in German, Toscanini intends it as a tribute to the German people who are being oppressed by Hitler. The second half is broadcast a week later. The performance is later released on LP and CD, the first of 7 operas that Toscanini conducts on radio.
 December 13 – Battle of Mindoro: United States, Australian and Philippine Commonwealth troops land in Mindoro Island, the Philippines.
 December 16 – General George C. Marshall becomes the first Five-Star General.
 December 22 – World War II: Brigadier General Anthony C. McAuliffe, commander of the U.S. forces defending Bastogne, refuses to accept demands for surrender by sending a one-word reply, "Nuts!", to the German command.
 December 24–26 – Agana race riot in Guam between white and black United States Marines.
 December 26 
World War II: American troops repulse German forces at Bastogne.
The Glass Menagerie by Tennessee Williams premieres in Chicago.
 December 30 – Edward Stettinius Jr. becomes the last United States Secretary of State of the Roosevelt administration, filling the seat left by Cordell Hull.

Undated
 National Committee for Education on Alcoholism, predecessor of the National Council on Alcoholism and Drug Dependence, is established by Marty Mann.
 14-year-old Warren Buffett's father introduces him to a newspaper office to do the job of taking a newspaper to the subscriber. Then, with a salary of US$1,200, he buys 40 acres of land and starts a sub-leased tenant farming business.
 Rio Grande company is founded in Albuquerque, New Mexico.

Ongoing
 World War II, U.S. involvement (1941–1945)

Births

January

 January 1 – Robert Lee Minor, American actor, stunt performer
 January 4
 Frank Alesia, American actor and television director (d. 2011)
 Charlie Manuel, American baseball player and manager
 January 5 – Carolyn McCarthy, American nurse and politician
 January 6 – Bonnie Franklin, American actress, singer, dancer and television director (d. 2013)
 January 9 – Ian Hornak, American painter (d. 2002)
 January 10 – Frank Sinatra Jr., American singer, songwriter and actor (d. 2016)
 January 12 – Joe Frazier, African American boxer, world heavyweight champion from 1970 to 1973 (d. 2011)
 January 13 – Chris von Saltza, American swimmer
 January 19
 Shelley Fabares, American actress, singer
 Dan Reeves, American football player and coach (d. 2022)
 January 20 – Linda Moulton Howe, American journalist and producer
 January 25 – Evan Chandler, American screenwriter and dentist (d. 2009)
 January 26 
 Angela Davis, African-American political activist, academic and author
 Jerry Sandusky, American football coach and child molester
 January 27 – Sam Smith, American basketball player (d. 2022)
 January 28 – Susan Howard, American actress
 January 31 – Connie Booth, American writer and actress

February

 February 1 – Mike Enzi, American politician (d. 2021)
 February 5 – Al Kooper, American rock musician (Blood, Sweat & Tears)
 February 8 – Bunky Henry, American professional golfer (d. 2018)
 February 9 – Alice Walker, African-American novelist and poet
 February 11 – Mike Oxley, American politician (d. 2016)
 February 12 – Moe Bandy, American country music singer
 February 13
 Sal Bando, American baseball player and manager (d. 2023)
 Stockard Channing, American actress
 Michael Ensign, American actor
 Sheldon Silver, American politician, attorney and convicted felon (d. 2022)
 February 14 – Carl Bernstein, American journalist
 February 15 – Rommy Hunt Revson, singer and inventor (d. 2022)
 February 16 – Richard Ford, American novelist
 February 19 – Donald F. Glut, American writer, film director and screenwriter
 February 22
 Jonathan Demme, American film director, producer and screenwriter (d. 2017)
 Robert Kardashian, American attorney and businessman (d. 2003)
 February 23 – Johnny Winter, American rock musician (d. 2014)
 February 27 – Ken Grimwood, American writer (d. 2003)
 February 29 
 Dennis Farina, American actor (d. 2013)
 Phyllis Frelich, deaf actress (d. 2014)

March

 March 1 – John Breaux, American politician
 March 3 – Odessa Cleveland, American actress (M*A*S*H)
 March 4 – Bobby Womack, African-American singer-songwriter (d. 2014)
 March 6 – Mary Wilson, African-American singer (The Supremes) (d. 2021)
 March 7
 Michael Rosbash, American geneticist and chronobiologist, recipient of the Nobel Prize in Physiology or Medicine in 2017
 Townes Van Zandt, American country singer (d. 1997) 
 March 11 – Richard McGeagh, American Olympic swimmer and water polo player (d. 2021)
 March 14 – Steve Daskewisz, American actor (d. 2018)
 March 15 – Ralph MacDonald, American percussionist, songwriter (d. 2011)
 March 16 – Granville Van Dusen, American actor
 March 17 – John Sebastian, American singer-songwriter (The Lovin' Spoonful)
 March 23 – Ric Ocasek, American singer, songwriter and record producer (The Cars) (d. 2019)
 March 24 – R. Lee Ermey, U.S. Marine and actor (d. 2018)
 March 26 – Diana Ross, African-American actress and singer (The Supremes)
 March 27 – Thomas H. Lee, American private equity investor (d. 2023)
 March 28
 Rick Barry, American basketball player
 Ken Howard, American actor (d. 2016)
 March 29 – Denny McLain, American baseball player
 March 31 – Angus King, American politician

April

 April 1 – Rusty Staub, American baseball player and coach
 April 3 – Tony Orlando, American musician
 April 4 – Craig T. Nelson, American actor
 April 5 – Peter T. King, American politician
 April 6 – Judith McConnell, American actress
 April 7
 Shel Bachrach, American insurance broker, investor, businessman and philanthropist
 Warner Fusselle, American sportscaster (d. 2012)
 April 8 – Jimmy Walker, American professional basketball player (d. 2007)
 April 11 – John Milius, American film director, producer and screenwriter
 April 13 – Jack Casady, American rock musician (Jefferson Airplane, Hot Tuna)
 April 18 – Charlie Tuna, American disc jockey and game show announcer (d. 2016)
 April 19
 Bernie Worrell, American rock keyboardist, (d. 2016)
 James Heckman, economist, recipient of the Nobel Memorial Prize in Economic Sciences in 2000
 April 21 – Paul Geremia, American singer-songwriter and guitarist
 April 22 – Steve Fossett, American millionaire adventurer (d. 2007)
 April 24 – Tony Visconti, American record producer, musician and singer
 April 26 – Larry H. Miller, American sports owner (Utah Jazz; d. 2009)
 April 27 – Cuba Gooding Sr., African-American actor and singer (d. 2017)
 April 29 – Richard Kline, American actor and television director
 April 30 – Jill Clayburgh, American actress (d. 2010)

May

 May 1 – Marva Whitney, American singer (d. 2012)
 May 3 – Rusty Wier, American singer-songwriter (d. 2009)
 May 4 – Russi Taylor, American actress (d. 2019)
 May 9
 Richie Furay, American musician (Poco, Buffalo Springfield)
 Laurence Owen, American figure skater (d. 1961)
 May 10 – Jim Abrahams, American film director
 May 13
 Carolyn Franklin, American singer (d. 1988)
 Armistead Maupin, American fiction writer
 May 14
 Connie Lawn, American journalist (d. 2018) 
 George Lucas, American filmmaker and entrepreneur
 May 16 – Danny Trejo, Hispanic-American actor
 May 17 – Jesse Winchester, American-Canadian musician and songwriter (d. 2014) 
 May 18 – Marianne Battani, American jurist (d. 2021)
 May 24
 David Mark Berger, American-born Israeli weightlifter (k. in Munich massacre 1972)
 Patti LaBelle, African-American singer, actress and entrepreneur
 May 26 – Jan Schakowsky, American politician
 May 27 
 Jon Brittenum, American football player (d. 2022)
 Chris Dodd, American politician
 May 28
 Rudy Giuliani, American politician, former Mayor of New York City
 Gladys Knight, African-American singer
 Sondra Locke, American actress and director (d. 2018)
 May 30 – Meredith MacRae, American actress (d. 2000)

June

 June 2
 Garo Yepremian, American football player (d. 2015)
 Marvin Hamlisch, American composer, conductor (d. 2012)
 June 3 – Mary Thom, American journalist and author (d. 2013)
 June 4 – Michelle Phillips, American singer and actress 
 June 5 – Whitfield Diffie, American cryptographer
 June 6 
 Phillip Allen Sharp, American geneticist and molecular biologist
 Tommie Smith, African-American track athlete
 June 8
 Mark Belanger, American baseball player (d. 1998)
 Don Grady, American actor and singer (d. 2012)
 Boz Scaggs, American singer and guitarist
 June 9 – Roger Bonk, American football player (d. 2023)
 June 17 – Bill Rafferty, American comedian and impressionist (d. 2012)
 June 18
 Sandy Posey, American musician
 Rick Griffin, American artist (d. 1991)
 June 21 – Kenny O'Dell, American country singer-songwriter (d. 2018)
 June 29 – Gary Busey, American actor
 June 30
 Terry Funk, American professional wrestler
 Raymond Moody, American parapsychologist
 Alan C. Fox, American author, philanthropist and entrepreneur

July

 July 1 – Diron Talbert, American football player
 July 2 – Paul Schudel, American football player and coach
 July 8
 Jaimoe, American drummer (The Allman Brothers Band)
 Jeffrey Tambor, American actor
 July 16 – Betty Davis, American singer, songwriter and model (d. 2022)
 July 17 – Tom Kalinske, American businessman
 July 20 – W. Cary Edwards, American politician (d. 2010)
 July 21 – Paul Wellstone, American politician (d. 2002)
 July 26
 Celeste Yarnall, American actress (d. 2018)
 Kiel Martin, American actor (d. 1990)
 July 31
 Geraldine Chaplin, English-American actress
 Robert C. Merton, American economist

August

 August 4
 Richard Belzer, American actor and comedian
 William Frankfather, American actor (d. 1998)
 August 7 
 Denny Freeman, American guitarist (d. 2021)
 John Glover, American actor
 Robert Mueller, American lawyer and former FBI director
 August 8 – Michael Johnson, American singer-songwriter and guitarist (d. 2017)
 August 9 – Sam Elliott, American actor
 August 13 – Kevin Tighe, American actor
 August 15
  Linda Ellerbee, American journalist and author
 Thomas J. Murphy, Jr., politician, 56th Mayor of Pittsburgh
 August 17 – Larry Ellison, co-founder of Oracle Corporation
 August 24 
 Henry Braden, lawyer and politician (d. 2013)
 Gregory Jarvis, astronaut (d. 1986)
 August 25 – Christine Chubbuck, American television reporter (d. 1974)
 August 27 – G. W. Bailey, American actor 
 August 30 – Tug McGraw, American baseball player (d. 2004)
 August 31 – Earnie Shavers, African-American professional wrestler

September

 September 1 – Leonard Slatkin, American conductor
 September 3 – Ty Warner, American businessman, inventor of Beanie Babies
 September 7 
 Earl Manigault, American basketball player (d. 1998)
 Jerry Relph, American politician, member of the Minnesota Senate (d. 2020)
 September 12
 Leonard Peltier, Native American activist and convicted murderer
 Barry White, African-American R&B and soul singer (d. 2003)
 September 13 – Peter Cetera, lead singer and guitarist of American rock group Chicago
 September 18 – Satan's Angel, American exotic dancer
 September 21
 Caleb Deschanel, American cinematographer and film director
 Hamilton Jordan, American politician, 8th White House Chief of Staff (d. 2008)
 September 25 – Michael Douglas, American actor and producer

October

 October 2 – Vernor Vinge, American science fiction author and mathematician
 October 4 – Tony La Russa, American baseball player and manager
 October 6 – Mylon LeFevre, American singer and evangelist
 October 8 – Dale Dye, American actor, technical advisor, radio personality and U.S. Marine
 October 9 – Nona Hendryx, American R&B singer (Labelle)
 October 11 – William T. Greenough, American neuroscientist (d. 2013)
 October 13 – Margo Lion, American theatrical producer (d. 2020)
 October 15
 Mac Collins, American politician (d. 2018)
 Kay Ivey, American politician
 October 16 – Elizabeth Loftus, American psychologist
 October 19 – George McCrae, American soul and disco singer
 October 28 – Dennis Franz, American actor
 October 31 – Hal Wick, American politician (d. 2018)

November

 November 1
 Florindo Fabrizio, American politician (d. 2018)
 Kinky Friedman, American singer, songwriter, novelist, humorist, politician and columnist
 Bobby Heenan, American professional wrestling manager and commentator (d. 2017)
 November 2 – Michael Buffer, American ring announcer and actor
 November 4 – Linda Gary, American voice actress (d. 1995)
 November 5 – Leland Wilkinson, American statistician and computer scientist (d. 2021)
 November 7 – Joe Niekro, American baseball player (d. 2006)
 November 10 – Silvestre Reyes, American politician 
 November 12
 Booker T. Jones, African-American musician, singer and songwriter
 Al Michaels, American sportscaster
 November 17
 Jim Boeheim, American basketball player and coach
 Gene Clark, American singer-songwriter (d. 1991)
 Danny DeVito, American actor, film producer and director
 Gary Goldman, American animator, film producer and director
 Tom Seaver, American baseball player (d. 2020)
 Sammy Younge Jr., American civil rights activist (d. 1966)
 November 18 
 Lorinda Cherry, American computer scientist (d. 2022)
 Ed Krupp, American astronomer, Director of the Griffith Observatory and science popularizer
 November 20 – Donald DiFrancesco, American lawyer and politician, 51st Governor of New Jersey
 November 21
 Dick Durbin, American politician
 Harold Ramis, American actor, director and comedy writer (d. 2014)
 November 24 – Candy Darling, American actress (d. 1974)
 November 25 – Ben Stein, American law professor, actor and author
 November 27 – Mickey Leland, American politician (d. 1989)
 November 28 – Rita Mae Brown, American fiction writer and political activist

December

 December 1 – John Densmore, drummer, member of The Doors.
 December 2 – Cathy Lee Crosby, American actress (That's Incredible!)
 December 4 – Dennis Wilson, American drummer (The Beach Boys) (d. 1983)
 December 6
 Kit Culkin, American stage actor
 Ron Kenoly, American Christian leader
 December 7 – Daniel Chorzempa, American organist
 December 9 – Ki Longfellow, American novelist
 December 11
 Teri Garr, American actress
 Lynda Day George, American actress
 Brenda Lee, American singer
 December 19 – Tim Reid, African-American actor and film director
 December 20 – Bobby Colomby, American drummer and producer
 December 21 – Michael Tilson Thomas, American conductor
 December 22 – Steve Carlton, American baseball player
 December 23 – Wesley Clark, U.S. general and NATO Supreme Allied Commander
 December 26 – Bill Ayers, American education theorist and former radical anti-war activist
 December 28
 Johnny Isakson, American politician
 Kary Mullis, American biochemist (d. 2019)
 December 30 – Joseph Hilbe, American statistician and author

Deaths
 January 6 – Ida Tarbell, investigative journalist (b. 1857)
 January 7 – Lou Henry Hoover, wife of Herbert Hoover, First Lady of the United States (b. 1874)
 March 7 – August Busck, entomologist and author of works on microlepidoptera (b. 1870 in Denmark)
 March 11 – Irvin S. Cobb, writer (b. 1876)
 March 19 –  Henry Francis Bryan, governor of American Samoa (b. 1865)
 April 21 – Florence Trail, educator and author (b. 1854)
 April 25 – George Herriman, cartoonist (Krazy Kat) (b. 1880)
 May 8 – Albert Leo Stevens, balloonist (b. 1877)
 May 23 – Thomas Curtis, hurdler (b. 1873)
 June 30 – Georgia Hopley, journalist, political figure and temperance advocate (b. 1858)
 August 12 – Joseph P. Kennedy Jr., U.S. Navy lieutenant (b. 1915; k. in action)
 September 27 – Aimee Semple McPherson, Pentecostal evangelist (b. 1890 in Canada)
 October 4 – Al Smith, politician (b. 1873)
 October 21 – Lionel Pape, actor (b. 1877) 
 October 22 – Richard Bennett, stage and silent screen actor (b. 1870)
 November 2 – Thomas Midgley Jr., mechanical and chemical engineer (b. 1889)
 November 4 – Sir John Dill, British Army field marshal (b. 1881 in Ireland)
 November 9 
 Jane Grey, actress (b. 1883)
 Frank Marshall, chess player (b. 1877)
 November 12 – George Houston, actor (b. 1896)
 November 26 – Florence Foster Jenkins, socialite and amateur soprano (b. 1868)
 December 4 
 Grace Denio Litchfield, poet and novelist (b. 1849)
 Benjamin Wistar Morris, architect (b. 1870)
 Georgiana Simpson, African American philologist (b. 1865)
December 15 - Glenn Miller, conductor, trombonist (b. 1904)
 December 16 – Stuart Paton, British-born screenwriter and film director (b. 1883)
 December 31 – Ruth Hanna McCormick, politician, activist and publisher (b. 1880)

See also
 List of American films of 1944
 Timeline of United States history (1930–1949)
 Timeline of World War II

References

External links
 

 
1940s in the United States
United States
United States
Years of the 20th century in the United States